Amos Bristol Tavern is a historic inn and tavern located at West Meredith in Delaware County, New York, United States. It was built about 1800 and is a two-story, five bay building of post and beam construction with wooden plank walls.  It sits on a fieldstone foundation and is clad with narrow wooden clapboards.

It was listed on the National Register of Historic Places in 2000.

See also
National Register of Historic Places listings in Delaware County, New York

References

National Register of Historic Places in Delaware County, New York
Federal architecture in New York (state)
Commercial buildings completed in 1800
Buildings and structures in Delaware County, New York